This is a list of games at Funspot Family Fun Center, located in the village of Weirs Beach in Laconia, New Hampshire, United States. Funspot is ranked by Guinness World Records as the world's largest arcade. The majority of games at Funspot are part of the American Classic Arcade Museum's collection, a non-profit organization located on Funspot's second floor, whose goal is to "promote and preserve the history of coin-operated arcade games."

Games

The following tables list games located at Funspot. The lists are divided into the American Classic Arcade Museum games and games elsewhere in the center.

American Classic Arcade Museum

Games elsewhere in Funspot

References

Laconia, New Hampshire
Tourist attractions in New Hampshire
Video arcades
Funspot